Frank Ricotti (born 31 January 1949) is an English jazz vibraphonist and percussionist.

Early life and education 
Ricotti was born in London, England. His father was a drummer.  Bill Ashton, founder of the National Youth Jazz Orchestra (NYJO), was an early mentor. As a teenager, Ricotti played vibraphone and learned composition and arranging in the NYJO, and later attended Trinity College of Music between 1967 and 1970.

Career 
Ricotti worked with Neil Ardley (1968–71), Dave Gelly, Graham Collier, Mike Gibbs (1969–72), Stan Tracey (1970), Harry Beckett (1970–72), Norma Winstone (1971), Gordon Beck (1973–74), Hans Zimmer.

In the late 1960s and early 1970s, Ricotti led his own jazz quartet. A line-up of the band featuring the guitarist Chris Spedding, bassist Chris Laurence and drummer Bryan Spring recorded the album Our Point of View, released in July 1969. In 1971, in partnership with bassist Mike de Albuquerque, he released the album First Wind (as 'Ricotti and Albuquerque').

In the 1980s, he played with Chris Laurence and John Taylor in the group Paragonne, and played with Beck again in 1984. After this he worked primarily as a studio musician. 

Ricotti has recorded with artists such as Status Quo, Freddie Mercury, Pet Shop Boys, Swing Out Sister, Art of Noise, The Style Council, Belle and Sebastian, Clannad, Barclay James Harvest, Meat Loaf, Elkie Brooks, Rick Wakeman, Oasis, Tina Turner, Aztec Camera, Thomas Anders, Alphaville, and Mark Knopfler.

Between 1984 and 1987, Ricotti wrote the soundtrack music for Yorkshire Television's The Beiderbecke Trilogy, in the style of Bix Beiderbecke. The music was performed by his band, the Frank Ricotti All Stars, and featured Kenny Baker on cornet. A soundtrack album was released in 1988. Later, in June 1993, it peaked at No. 73 in the UK Albums Chart. Ricotti and his band made a cameo appearance in the final series, playing in a jazz club.

In 2007, Ricotti played vibes on Mark Knopfler's album, Kill to Get Crimson.

Instruments played
Ricotti is known to play congas, bongos, vibraphone, tambourine, shaker, tubular bells, marimba, glockenspiel, xylophone, snare drum, triangle, timpani, timbales, tabla, sleigh bells, drums, gong and assorted other percussion, including ethnic and Latin.

Discography

As leader
 Our Point of View (CBS Realm Jazz: 52668, 1969)
 First Wind (Ricotti & Albuquerque), (with Mike de Albuquerque), (Pegasus: PEG 2, 1971)

As sideman

With Alphaville
 Afternoons in Utopia (Atlantic, 1986)

With Thomas Anders
 Different (Teldec, 1989)

With Madeline Bell
 This is One Girl (Pyre Records, 1976)
 Madeline (Four Corners, 1993)

With Pet Shop Boys
 Very (Parlophone, 1993)
 Fundamental (Parlophone, 2006)

With Dee Dee Bridgewater
 Dear Ella (Verve, 1997)

With Elkie Brooks
 Pearls II (A&M Records, 1982)

With Emma Bunton
 Free Me (19, 2004)

With Paul Carrack
 One Good Reason (Chrysalis Records, 1987)
 Blue Views (I.R.S. Records, 1995)
 These Days (Carrack UK, 2018)

With Mary Chapin Carpenter
 Songs from the Movie (Zoe, 2014)

With Charlotte Church
 Enchantment (Columbia Records, 2001)

With Rosemary Clooney
 Nice to be Around (United Artists Records, 1977)

With Roger Daltrey
 McVicar (Polydor Records, 1980)

With Terence Trent D'Arby
 Introducing the Hardline According to Terence Trent D'Arby (Columbia Records, 1987)

With Sheena Easton
 Take My Time (EMI, 1981)
 You Could Have Been with Me (EMI, 1981)
 Madness, Money & Music (EMI, 1982)

With Bryan Ferry
 As Time Goes By (Virgin Records, 1999)
 Frantic (Virgin Records, 2002)
 Dylanesque (Virgin Records, 2007)
 Olympia (Virgin Records, 2010)
 The Jazz Age (BMG Rights Management, 2012)
 Avonmore (BMG Rights Management, 2014)
 Bitter-Sweet (BMG Rights Management, 2018)

With Julia Fordham
 Swept (Virgin Records, 1991)

With Peter Frampton
 Wind of Change (A&M Records, 1972)

With Gareth Gates
 What My Heart Wants to Say (RCA Records, 2002)
 Go Your Own Way (RCA Records, 2003)

With Clive Griffin
 Clive Griffin (Epic Records, 1993)

With Delta Goodrem
 Mistaken Identity (Epic Records, 2004)

With David Gray
 Life in Slow Motion (Atlantic Records, 2005)

With Josh Groban
 Awake (Reprise Records, 2006)
 Bridges (Reprise Records, 2018)

With Daryl Hall
 Soul Alone (Epic, 1993)

With Geri Halliwell
 Passion (EMI, 2005)

With Albert Hammond
 Albert Louis Hammond (Epic Records, 1978)

With Debbie Harry
 Debravation (Sire Records, 1993)

With Murray Head
 Nigel Lived (Columbia Records, 1972)

With John Illsley
 Glass (Vertigo, 1988)

With Elton John
 Ice on Fire (Geffen, 1985)
 Leather Jackets (Geffen, 1986)

With Grace Jones
 Slave to the Rhythm (Island Records, 1985)

With Joshua Kadison
 Painted Desert Serenade (Capitol Records, 1993)

With Nick Kamen
 Us (WEA, 1988)

With Beverley Knight
 Affirmation (Parlophone, 2004)

With Mark Knopfler
 Sailing to Philadelphia (Warner Bros. Records, 2000)
 Kill to Get Crimson (Warner Bros. Records, 2007)

With Nick Lachey
 SoulO (Universal, 2003)

With Lighthouse Family
 Ocean Drive (Polydor, 1995)

With Meat Loaf
 Bad Attitude (Arista, 1984)

With Freddie Mercury and Montserrat Caballé
 Barcelona (Polydor Records, 1988)

With Mika
 The Origin of Love (Casablanca Records, 2012)

With John Miles
 Play On (EMI, 1983)

With Joni Mitchell
 Both Sides Now (Reprise Records, 2000)

With Oliver Nelson
 Oliver Edward Nelson in London with Oily Rags (Flying Dutchman, 1974)

With Chris Norman
 Different Shades (Hansa, 1987)

With Sally Oldfield
 Water Bearer (Bronze Records, 1978)
 Easy (Bronze Records, 1979)
 Celebration (Bronze Records, 1980)
 Playing in the Flame (Bronze Records, 1981)
 Strange Day in Berlin (Bronze, 1983)

With Michel Polnareff
 Bulles (AZ, 1981)

With Gerry Rafferty
 Night Owl (United Artists Records, 1979)
 Snakes and Ladders (United Artists Records, 1980)
 Sleepwalking (Liberty Records, 1982)

With Chris Rea
 Whatever Happened to Benny Santini? (Magnet, 1978)

With Cliff Richard
 Every Face Tells a Story (EMI, 1977) 
 Together with Cliff Richard (EMI, 1991)

With Leo Sayer
 Have You Ever Been in Love (Chrysalis Records, 1983)

With Seal
 Soul 2 (Reprise Records, 2011)

With Status Quo
 Rockin' All Over the World (Vertigo, 1977)
 If You Can't Stand the Heat... (Vertigo, 1978)

With Amii Stewart
 Time for Fantasy (RCA Records, 1988)

With Rod Stewart
 A Spanner in the Works (Warner Bros. Records, 1995)

With Tina Turner
 Private Dancer (Capitol Records, 1984)
 Break Every Rule (Capitol Records, 1986)

With Rick Wakeman
 The Six Wives of Henry VIII (A&M, 1973)
 Rick Wakeman's Criminal Record (A&M, 1977)
 1984 (Charisma, 1981)

With Was (Not Was)
 What Up, Dog? (Chrysalis, 1988)

With Wet Wet Wet
 10 (Mercury, 1997)

With Robbie Williams
 Swing When You're Winning (Chrysalis Records, 2001)
 Swings Both Ways (Island Records, 2013)

With Amy Winehouse
 Back to Black (Universal, 2006)

References
Footnotes

General references
Simon Adams, "Frank Ricotti". Grove Jazz online.
John Chilton, Who's Who of British Jazz. 2004, Continuum International Publishing,

External links
Frank Ricotti at discogs.com

1949 births
Living people
British jazz vibraphonists
British male jazz musicians
Musicians from London
English session musicians
English people of Italian descent
British percussionists
Tabla players
English jazz drummers
Conga players
Timbaleros
Marimbists
Xylophonists
Bongo players
Tambourine players
Triangle players
Snare drummers
Timpanists
Tubular bells players
National Youth Jazz Orchestra members
New Jazz Orchestra members